The 2012–13 San Diego State men's basketball team represents San Diego State University in the 2012–13 college basketball season. They are members in the Mountain West Conference. This will be head coach Steve Fisher's fourteenth season at San Diego State. The Aztecs play home games at Viejas Arena. They finished with a record of 23–11 overall, 9–7 in Mountain West play for 3rd place tie with Boise State. They lost in the semifinals in the 2013 Mountain West Conference men's basketball tournament to New Mexico. They received an at-large bid in the 2013 NCAA Division I men's basketball tournament, in which they beat Oklahoma in the second round and lost in the third round to Florida Gulf Coast.

Off Season

Departures

Incoming Transfers

2012 Recruiting Class

Roster

Source

Schedule and results
Source
All times are Pacific

|-
!colspan=9| Exhibition

|-
!colspan=9| Regular Season

|-
!colspan=9| 2013 Mountain West Conference men's basketball tournament

|-
!colspan=9|2013 NCAA tournament

Rankings

*AP does not release post-NCAA Tournament rankings.

References

External links
Aztec Basketball Official Site 

San Diego State Aztecs men's basketball seasons
San Diego State
San Diego State